Herbowo (1935–2003) was an architect from Indonesia and administrator, He was born in Semarang, Indonesia. Graduated from ITB Institute Technology Bandung in 1960 then post graduated in 1962 from Copenhagen and later was appointed by President of Indonesia Soeharto cq Home Minister to become Vice of Head Government of Jakarta Capital City of Indonesia during 1988. After graduating from Copenhagen, Herbowo started to work at Pulo Mas together with Ir Radinal Moochtar in a company owned by the Government of Jakarta Capital City of Indonesia, later becoming head of Directorat IV during Governor Ali Sadikin dan Head of BAPPEDA. He introduced Route 3 in 1 in Jakarta Capital City.

Vice of Head Government of Jakarta Capital City of Indonesia 
Herbowo was Vice of Head Government of Jakarta Capital City of Indonesia as were as involved in the moving of Pekan Raya Jakarta from Jalan Merdeka Selatan was known with Jakarta Fair to Ex Airport Kemayoran, would later named Jakarta International Trade Fair in 1992.

References 
Town planning in the Dutch East Indies and Indonesia (1905-1950) 
 Book of Biografi Ali Sadikin. Writer Ali Sadikin. Pustaka Sinar Harapan. 1992.
Bappeda Jakarta 
Herbowo

1935 births
2003 deaths
20th-century Indonesian architects